The Inner Asian Mountain Corridor (IAMC) was an ancient exchange route ranging from the Altai Mountains in Siberia to the Hindu Kush (present-day Afghanistan and northern Pakistan), which took shape in the 3rd millennium BCE. The expansion of the Indo-European Andronovo culture towards the Bactria-Margiana Culture in the second millennium BCE took place along the IAMC, giving way to the Indo-Aryan migration into South Asia.

Mountain Corridor
The IAMC contributed to the development of mobile pastoralism in the 4th millennium BCE. Bronze Age mobile pastoralists acted as agents between Central Asian cultures and South Asian cultures via the IAMC, spreading domesticated wheats from South and East Asia to Inner Asia. Bronze Age pastoralists also transmitted horse riding and bronze technology between Europe and China, but also into South Asia.

Indo-European migrations
In the fourth millennium BCE a mobile pastoralist culture emerged at the Eurasian steppes. From the Pontic–Caspian steppe (present-day Ukraine and Russia), the Indo-European Yamna culture spread westwards toward the Great Hungarian Plain; and north-west it developed into the Corded Ware culture. Expanding eastward, Corded Ware eventually developed into the Sintashta culture, which further developed into the Andronovo culture. According to Narasimhan et al. (2018), the Andronovo-culture extended southwards via the IAMC, reaching into the Bactria-Margiana Culture, from where Indo-European language and culture reached South Asia.

References

Sources

 
 

 

 

Indo-European
Indo-European history
Nomadic groups in Eurasia